Zam Zam is an unreleased Indian Malayalam-language comedy drama film directed by G. Neelakanta Reddy, produced by Manu Kumaran and bankrolled by Taizoon Khorakiwala. The film is a remake of the 2014 Hindi film Queen by Vikas Bahl and features Manjima Mohan in the lead role.

Cast

 Manjima Mohan as Zama Nazreen
 Shibani Dandekar as Zama Farzil
 Sunny Wayne as Captain Bijumon
 Muthumani as Kavitha Karthiyayeni
 Baiju as Chackochan Nair

Production
In June 2014, Viacom 18 Motion Pictures, the producers of the Hindi film Queen (2014), made an official announcement that they had sold the remake rights for the Tamil, Telugu, Malayalam and Kannada versions of their film to Thiagarajan, who would make the films through his production studio, Staar Movies. Viacom put a caveat in the agreement that the principal photography of any of the films must start by 8 June 2017, else the rights would revert to Viacom.

Casting
Initially, Amala Paul signed on to play lead role and she was replaced by Manjima Mohan.

Filming

Post-Production

Soundtrack 

The music of the film is composed by Amit Trivedi and lyrics are by Rafeeq Ahammed.

See also
 That Is Mahalakshmi
 Paris Paris
 Butterfly

References

External links

Malayalam remakes of Hindi films
Indian comedy-drama films
Films shot in Tamil Nadu
Films shot in India
Films shot in Chennai
Films set in Paris
Films shot in Paris
Films shot in France
Films set in Barcelona
Films shot in Barcelona
Films shot in Spain
Films set in London
Films shot in London
Films shot in the United Kingdom
Films about women in India
Films scored by Amit Trivedi
Unreleased Malayalam-language films